Melmli Mosque, is a Tunisian mosque located in the north of the medina of Tunis.

Localization
The mosque is located in 93 the Pacha Street.

Etymology
The mosque got its name from its founder, bach hamba Slimane Melmli, a statesman and a correspondent of Hammuda Pasha in Europe. He died in 1823.

History
It was built during the Husainid era.

References

Bibliography 

Mosques in Tunis
19th-century mosques